After Spring is a 2016 documentary film directed by Ellen Martinez and Steph Ching that follows two families of refugees living in Zaatari, the largest refugee camp for Syrians.

Background
The film had its world premiere at the 2016 Tribeca Film Festival and its international premiere at Sheffield Doc/Fest. It is mostly in Arabic and Korean.

Funds were raised on Kickstarter for the production of the film.

Public Screenings
In May 2019, Sufra hosted a fundraiser in support of Syrian refugees labelled “From Syria, with Love.” The event involved a screening of the film After Spring. All money raised was directly donated to support refugees and asylum seekers.

References

External links

2016 documentary films
2016 films
American documentary films
2010s American films